The ATP Challenger Tour is the secondary professional tennis circuit organized by the ATP. The 2009 ATP Challenger Tour calendar comprised 20 top tier Tretorn SERIE+ tournaments, and 142 regular series tournaments, with prize money ranging from $25,000 up to $150,000.

Schedule

January

February

March

April

May

June

July

August

September

October

November

December 
No events that month.

Statistical information 

These tables present the number of singles (S) and doubles (D) titles won by each player and each nation during the season, within all the tournament categories of the 2009 ATP Challenger Tour: the Tretorn SERIE+ tournaments, and the regular series tournaments. The players/nations are sorted by: 1) total number of titles (a doubles title won by two players representing the same nation counts as only one win for the nation); 2) cumulated importance of those titles (one Tretorn SERIE+ win > one regular tournament win); 3) a singles > doubles hierarchy; 4) alphabetical order (by family names for players).

Key

Titles won by player

Titles won by nation

See also 
 2009 ITF Women's Circuit
 2009 ATP World Tour
 2009 WTA Tour
 Association of Tennis Professionals
 International Tennis Federation

References 
General

 
 

Specific

External links 
 Association of Tennis Professionals (ATP) World Tour official website
 International Tennis Federation (ITF) official website

 
ATP Challenger Tour
ATP Challenger Tour